The Belview School is a historic building in Macon County, Tennessee, United States.

The school was built by Leo Butrum in 1936, and the first teacher was Lewis Bandy. It was named for Mr Belview, a teacher from Kentucky who taught at the original Belview School on Puncheon Creek Road in the 1890s. The school closed down circa 1959, and it was later used as a community meeting place. It has been listed on the National Register of Historic Places since March 21, 2007.

It was built to a standard plan for a two-teacher rural schoolhouse.

See also
Galen Elementary School, another NRHP-listed schoolhouse in Macon County

References

1936 establishments in Tennessee
School buildings completed in 1936
Educational institutions established in 1936
Educational institutions disestablished in 1959
Defunct schools in Tennessee
National Register of Historic Places in Macon County, Tennessee